Stefan Stremersch (born 1972) holds the Desiderius Erasmus Distinguished Chair of Economics and a Chair of Marketing, both at Erasmus University Rotterdam, the Netherlands and is professor of marketing at IESE Business School, Barcelona, Spain. His main research interests focus on innovation diffusion, marketing of technology and science, marketing strategy, new product growth, business economics of the life sciences and commercialization of new technologies. He is the scientific director of the Erasmus Healthcare Business Center and ECMI (European Center of Marketing and Innovation). Stremersch is also founder and director at The Marketing Technology and Innovation Institute (MTI²), a consulting company focused on helping companies innovate.

Early life
Stremersch graduated with the highest honors from Tilburg University (Ph.D. in Business Economics, 2001) and Ghent University (B.A and M.A. in Applied Economics, 1996). He also held positions at University of Southern California (USA), University of California at Los Angeles (USA), Emory University (USA) and Duke University (USA).

Career and awards
As a professor at the Erasmus University of Rotterdam and IESE he has taught at all levels including bachelor's- and master's-level courses in Economics, bachelor's-level courses in Business, MBA, EMBA, Global MBA and open programs (PLD, PMD). Stremersch teaches marketing, marketing strategy, marketing innovation, and marketing of high technology in IESE's MBA and executive education programs. Before joining IESE, he taught at Duke University (Fuqua), Emory University (Goizueta) and LBS. He has taught in many in-company programs for companies such as 3M, Alcatel-Lucent, Ericsson, Henkel, Komatsu, Philips, and Rabobank. Through MTI² he has consulted for a number of companies, such as Alcatel-Lucent, KLM, Michelin, Merck, Heraeus, Sabic, SKF and NWO (Netherlands Organisation for Scientific Research)

Stremersch has won several awards, such as the Harold H. Maynard Best Paper Award of the Journal of Marketing (2002), the J.C. Ruigrok Prize for the most productive young researcher in the social sciences in the Netherlands (awarded only once every four years), and the Rajan Varadarajan Early Career Award of the American Marketing Association (in 2008). He was awarded the American Marketing Association Maynard Award for the most significant contribution to marketing thought (2003) and the American Marketing Association Global Marketing Award (2006). In 2015, Stefan Stremersch was awarded the prestigious International Francqui Chair by Ghent University (Belgium).

In 2009, a paper published in Journal of Marketing cited him as the second most prolific scholar in top marketing journals. In 2012, a paper published in International Journal of Research in Marketing was awarded with the best paper award. In 2014 he won the best paper award of the International Journal of Research in Marketing for the 2nd time in 3 years. He is editorial board member of several journals, including Journal of Marketing Research, International Journal of Research in Marketing and Marketing Science. From 2006 till 2009 he has been editor of the International Journal of Research in Marketing (EMAC - Europe).

Publications

Journal articles

 “Gear Manufacturers as Contestants in Sport Competitions: Breeding and Branding Returns”, with Yvonne van Everdingen and Vijay G. Hariharan, Journal of Marketing, 2019.
 “Tournaments to Crowdsource Innovation: The Role of Moderator Feedback and Participation Intensity,” with Nuno Camacho, Hyoryung Nam, P.K. Kannan, Journal of Marketing, 2019.
 “Advertising non-premium products as if they were premium: The impact of advertising up on advertising elasticity and brand equity,”(with Ivan Guitart and Jorge Gonzalez), International Journal of Research in Marketing, 2018, 35(3), 471–489.
 “Predicting the consequences of marketing policy changes: A new data enrichment method with competitive reactions,” (with Eelco Kappe and Sriram Venkataraman), Journal of Marketing Research, 2017, 54(5) 720–736.
 “Drug Detailing and Doctors’ Prescription Decisions: The Role of Information Content in the Face of Competitive Entry”, (with Eelco Kappe), Marketing Science, 2016, 35(6), 915–933.
 “Introduction to the IJRM Special Issue on Marketing and Innovation”, (with Gui Liberali, Eitan Muller and Ronald T. Rust), International Journal of Research in Marketing, 2015, 32(3), 235–237. 
 “Unraveling Scientific Impact: Citation Types in Marketing Journals”, (with Nuno Camacho, Sofie Vanneste and Isabel Verniers), International Journal of Research in Marketing, 2015, 32(1), 64–77.
 “The Effect of Customer Empowerment on Adherence to Expert Advice”, (with Nuno Camacho and Martijn De Jong), International Journal of Research in Marketing, 2014, 31(3), 293–308.
 “Variable Selection in International Diffusion Models”, (with Sarah Gelper), International Journal of Research in Marketing, 2014, 31(4), 356–367.
 "The Commercial Contribution of Clinical Studies for Pharmaceutical Drugs", (with Ashish Sood and Eelco Kappe), International Journal of Research in Marketing, 2014, 31(1), 65–77.
 "From Academic Research to Marketing Practice: Exploring the Marketing Science Value Chain", (with John Roberts and Ujwal Kayande),International Journal of Research in Marketing, 2014.
 "The Relationship between DTCA, Drug Requests and Prescriptions: Uncovering Variation in Specialty and Space", (with Vardit Landsman & Sriram Venkataraman), Marketing Science, 2013, 32 (1), 89–110. 
 "Analysis of Sensitive Questions Across Cultures: An Application of Multigroup Item Randomized Response Theory to Sexual Attitudes and Behavior", (with Martijn de Jong & Rik Pieters), Journal of Personality and Social Psychology, 2012, 103 (3), 543–564. 
 "Dynamics in International Market Segmentation of New Product Growth", (with Aurélie Lemmens & Christophe Croux), International Journal of Research in Marketing, 2012, 29 (1), 81–92. 
 "Multi-Homing in Two-Sided Markets: An Empirical Inquiry in the Video Game Console Industry", (with Vardit Landsman), Journal of Marketing, 2011, 75 (November), 39–52. 
 "The Global Entry of New Pharmaceuticals: A Joint Investigation of Launch Window and Price", (with Isabel Verniers & Christophe Croux), International Journal of Research in Marketing, 2011, 28 (4), 295–308.  
 "Predictably Non-Bayesian: Quantifying Salience Effects in Physician Learning About Drug Quality", (with Nuno Camacho & Bas Donkers), Marketing Science 30 (2), 2011, 305–320. 
 "Does New Product Growth Accelerate Across Technology Generations?", (with Eitan Muller & Renana Peres), Marketing Letters, 21 (2), 2010, 103–120. 
 "Editorial Marketing competition in the 21st century", (with Oliver Heil and Don Lehmann), International Journal of Research in Marketing, 27, 2010, 161–163. 
 "The Evolving Social Network of Marketing Scholars", (with Jacob Goldenberg, Barak Libai, and Eitan Muller), Marketing Science, 29 (3), 2010, 561–567. 
 "Preface to The chilling effects of network externalities", (with Donald R. Lehmann and Marnik G. Dekimpe), International Journal of Research in Marketing, 27 (1), 2010, 1–3. 
 "From the (Past) Editors", (with Donald R. Lehmann), International Journal of Research in Marketing, 26 (4), 2009, 257–258.
 "Preface to a Debate", (with Donald R. Lehmann), International Journal of Research in Marketing, 26 (2), 2009, 153. 
 "Marketing of the Life Sciences: A New Framework and Research Agenda for a Nascent Field", (with Walter Van Dyck), "lead article" "article featured on JM blog", Journal of Marketing, 73 (4), 2009, 4-30.
 "Modeling Global Spill-Over in New Product Takeoff", (with Yvonne Van Everdingen and Dennis Fok), Journal of Marketing Research, 46 (5), 2009, 637–652.
 "The Effect of Superstar Software on Hardware Sales in System Markets", (with Jeroen L.G. Binken), Journal of Marketing, 73 (2), 2009, 88–104.
 "Sales Growth of New Pharmaceuticals Across the Globe: The Role of Regulatory Regimes", (with Aurélie Lemmens), Marketing Science, 28 (4), 2009, 690–708. 
 "Health and Marketing: The Emergence of a New Field of Research", International Journal of Research in Marketing, 25 (4), 2008, 229–233. 
 "25 Years of IJRM: Reflections on the Past and the Future", (with Donald R. Lehmann), International Journal of Research in Marketing, 25 (3), 2008, 143–148.  
 "Editorial", (with Don Lehmann), International Journal of Research in Marketing, 24 (4), 2007, 277. 
 "The Debate on Influencing Doctors' Decisions: Are Drug Characteristics the Missing Link?", (with Sriram Venkataraman), Management Science, 53 (11), 2007, 1688–1701. 
 "The Quest for Citations: Drivers of Article Impact", (with Isabel Verniers and Peter C. Verhoef), Journal of Marketing, 71 (3), 2007, 171–193. 
 "Indirect Network Effects in New Product Growth", (with Gerard Tellis, Philip Hans Franses and Jeroen L.G. Binken), Journal of Marketing, Chicago: 71 (3), 2007, 52–74. 
 "Editorial", (with Don Lehmann), International Journal of Research in Marketing, 24 (1), 2007, 1–2.  
 "Customizing Complex Products: When Should the Vendor Take Control?", (with Mrinal Ghosh and Shantanu Dutta), Journal of Marketing Research, 43 (November), 2006, 664–679. 
 "Globalization of Authorship in the Marketing Discipline: Evolution, Country Productivity and Consequences", (with Peter C. Verhoef),Marketing Science, 24 (4), 2005, 585–594.
 "Marketing Mass Customized Products: Striking the Balance between Utility and Complexity", (with Benedict G.C. Dellaert), Journal of Marketing Research, 42 (May), 2005, 219–227. 
 "Understanding and Managing International Growth of New Products", (with Gerard J. Tellis), International Journal of Research in Marketing, 21 (4), 2004, 421–438. 
 "Vertical Marketing Systems for Complex Products: A Triadic Perspective", (with Stefan Wuyts, Christophe Van den Bulte and Philip Hans Franses), Journal of Marketing Research, 41 (November), 2004, 479–487. 
 "Social Contagion and Income Heterogeneity in New Product Diffusion: A Meta-Analytic Test", (with Christophe Van den Bulte), Marketing Science, 23 (4), 2004, 530–544. 
 "Portfolios of Interfirm Agreements in Technology-Intensive Markets: Consequences for Innovation and Profitability", (with Stefan Wuyts and Shantanu Dutta), Journal of Marketing, 68 (2), 2004, 88–100. 
 "Buying Modular Systems in Technology-Intensive Markets", (with Allen M. Weiss, Benedict G.C. Dellaert and Ruud T. Frambach), Journal of Marketing Research, 40 (3), 2003, 335–350. 
 "The International Takeoff of New Products: The Role of Economics, Culture, and Country Innovativeness", (with Gerard J. Tellis and Eden Yin), Marketing Science, 22 (2), 2003, 188–208.  
 "Strategic Bundling of Products and Prices: A New Synthesis For Marketing", (with Gerard J. Tellis), Journal of Marketing, 66 (January), 2002, 55–72. 
 "The Purchasing of Full-Service Contracts: An Exploratory Study within the Industrial Maintenance Market", (with Stefan Wuyts & Ruud T. Frambach), Industrial Marketing Management, 2001, 30 (1),  1–12.

Books
 Stremersch, S. & Tindemans, E.B. (2007). Verlicht Ondernemen. Leuven (Belgie) en Rotterdam (Nederland): Lannoo Campus/Scriptum.
 Ding, M., Eliashberg, J. & Stremersch, S. (2014). Innovation and Marketing in the Pharmaceutical Industry: Emerging Practices, Research, and Policies. Springer.
 Stremersch S., (2016). "Kiezen voor Winst", Boom: , www.kiezenvoorwinst.nl (How Winners Make Choices in English)

Book chapters
 “The What, Who and How of Innovation Generation”, (with Elio Keko and Gert Jan Prevo), in Handbook of Research on New Product Development (edited by Peter Golder and Debanjan Mitra), Edward Elgar,  (2018)
 “The Successful Launch and Diffusion of New Therapies”, In M. Ding, J. Eliashberg & S. Stremersch (Eds.), Innovation and Marketing in the Pharmaceutical Industry: Emerging Practices, Research, and Policies. Springer. (with Vardit Landsman and Isabel Verniers), (2014), 189–223.
“Grassroots Innovation: A Promising Innovation Paradigm for Pharmaceutical Companies”, In M. Ding, J. Eliashberg & S. Stremersch (Eds.), Innovation and Marketing in the Pharmaceutical Industry: Emerging Practices, Research, and Policies. Springer. (with Ulrich Betz, Nuno Camacho and Michael Gerards), (2014), 119–148.
“The Connected Patient”, In The Book on the Connected Customer, Tilburg Lustrum, in press. (with Nuno Camacho and Vardit Landsman), January 2010, 107–139.

References

1972 births
Living people
Academic staff of Erasmus University Rotterdam
Ghent University alumni
University of Southern California faculty
University of California, Los Angeles faculty
Emory University faculty
Tilburg University alumni
Duke University faculty